Mahālangūr Himāl (Mahālaṅgūra himāla) is a section of the Himalayas in northeast Nepal and south-central Tibet of China extending east from the pass Nangpa La between Rolwaling Himal and Cho Oyu, to the Arun River. It includes Mount Everest, Lhotse, Makalu, and Cho Oyu — four of Earth's six highest peaks.  On the Tibetan side it is drained by the Rongbuk and Kangshung Glaciers and on the Nepali side by Barun, Ngojumba and Khumbu Glaciers and others.  All are tributaries to the Koshi River via Arun River on the north and east or Dudh Kosi on the south.

Mahalangur Himal can be divided into three subsections:
Makālu nearest the Arun River and along the Nepal-China border including Makalu 8463m, Chomo Lonzo 7790m south of the Kama valley in Tibet, Kangchungtse or Makalu II 7678m, Peak 7199 and some ten others over 6000 metres.
Barun (Baruṇa) inside Nepal and south of the Makālu section.  It includes Chamlang 7319m and Chamlang East 7235m, Peak 7316, Baruntse 7129m, Ama Dablam 6812m and about 17 others over 6000 metres.
Khumbu along the international border west of the Makalu section, Including the Everest massif: Everest 8848m, Lhotse 8516m, Nuptse 7855m and Changtse 7580m.  West of Everest are Pumori 7161m and Cho Oyu 8201m plus some 20 others over 7000 metres and 36 over 6000 metres.

The Khumbu region of Nepal is the best known populated part of the Mahalangurs since it is on the access trail to the normal (South Col) route up Everest.

References

Mountain ranges of the Himalayas
Mountain ranges of Nepal
Mountain ranges of Tibet
Mount Everest
Koshi Province